Anatoliy Zharikin is a Soviet sprint canoer who competed in the mid-1970s. He won two medals in the K-4 10000 m at the ICF Canoe Sprint World Championships with a gold in 1974 and a bronze in 1975.

References

Living people
Soviet male canoeists
Year of birth missing (living people)
Russian male canoeists
ICF Canoe Sprint World Championships medalists in kayak